Rinzia triplex, commonly known as triad rinzia, is a plant species of the family Myrtaceae endemic to Western Australia.

The shrub is found in the southern Goldfields-Esperance region of Western Australia between Coolgardie, Menzies and Yilgarn.

References

triplex
Endemic flora of Western Australia
Myrtales of Australia
Rosids of Western Australia
Vulnerable flora of Australia
Plants described in 2017
Taxa named by Barbara Lynette Rye
Taxa named by Malcolm Eric Trudgen